The 2018 IIHF U18 World Championship Division II were two international under-18 ice hockey tournaments organised by the International Ice Hockey Federation. The Division II A and Division II B tournaments represent the fourth and the fifth tier of the IIHF World U18 Championship.

Division II A

The Division II A tournament was played in Tallinn, Estonia, from 1 to 7 April 2018.

Participants

Final standings

Results
All times are local. (Eastern European Summer Time – UTC+3)

Awards
Best Players Selected by the Directorate
 Goaltender:  Sebastian Lipiński
 Defenceman:  Dominykas Motiejūnas
 Forward:  Mason Alderson
Source: IIHF

Division II B

The Division II B tournament was played in Zagreb, Croatia, from 24 to 30 March 2018.

Participants

Final standings

Results
All times are local. (24 March: Central European Time – UTC+1, from 25 March: Central European Summer Time – UTC+2)

Awards
Best Players Selected by the Directorate
 Goaltender:  Domagoj Troha
 Defenceman:  Aron Sarmiento
 Forward:  Wang Jing
Source: IIHF

References

IIHF World U18 Championship Division II
2018 IIHF World U18 Championships
2018
2018
Sports competitions in Tallinn
Sports competitions in Zagreb
2017–18 in Estonian ice hockey
2017–18 in Croatian ice hockey
IIHF
IIHF